Joba is a given name. Notable people with the name include:

 Joba Chamberlain, American baseball player
 Joba Majhi (born 1960), Indian politician
 Joba Murmu, Indian writer
 Joba van den Berg-Jansen (born 1958), Dutch politician

See also
Juba § People, list of people with the name Juba